Haya Victoria van Someren-Downer (born Gerarda Victoria Downer; 5 July 1926 – 12 November 1980) was a Dutch politician of the People's Party for Freedom and Democracy (VVD) and journalist.

She was a Member of the House of Representatives from 20 March 1959 until 1 October 1968. She was the People's Party for Freedom and Democracy party chair from 29 March 1969 until 15 March 1975. She became a Member of the Senate on 17 September 1974 and on 5 June 1976 she succeeded Harm van Riel as the Parliamentary leader of the People's Party for Freedom and Democracy in the Senate after he retired. She died on 12 November 1980 from cancer at the age of 54.

Decorations

References

External links

Official
  H.V. (Haya) van Someren-Downer Parlement & Politiek
  H.V. van Someren-Downer (VVD) Eerste Kamer der Staten-Generaal

 

1926 births
1980 deaths
Chairmen of the People's Party for Freedom and Democracy
Deaths from cancer in the Netherlands
Dutch newspaper editors
Dutch political journalists
Dutch reporters and correspondents
Knights of the Order of the Netherlands Lion
Members of the House of Representatives (Netherlands)
Members of the Senate (Netherlands)
Members of the Provincial Council of South Holland
Journalists from Amsterdam
People's Party for Freedom and Democracy politicians
Remonstrants
University of Amsterdam alumni
Vrije Universiteit Amsterdam alumni
Politicians from Amsterdam
Writers from Rotterdam
20th-century Dutch journalists
20th-century Dutch women politicians
20th-century Dutch politicians
20th-century Dutch women writers